The 2017–18 season was the 24th season for the Ontario Junior Hockey League.

Standings 
Note: GP = Games played; W = Wins; L = Losses; OTL = Overtime losses; SL = Shootout losses; GF = Goals for; GA = Goals against; PTS = Points; x = clinched playoff berth; y = clinched division title; z = clinched conference title

North East Conference

South West Conference

Playoffs

External links 
 Official website of the Ontario Junior Hockey League
 Official website of the Canadian Junior Hockey League
http://ojhl_site.wttstats.pointstreak.com/standings.html?leagueid=231&seasonid=17351

Ontario Junior Hockey League seasons
OJHL